Elisabeth Kohut-Mannstein, also Elisabeth Kohut-Manstein, real name Elisabeth Steinmann (3 May 1843 – 29 November 1926) was a German operatic soprano and voice teacher.

Life 
Steinmann was born in Dresden and had a sister named Grete. She was trained by her father, the singing teacher Heinrich Ferdinand Mannstein, who was known under the pseudonym Heinrich Ferdinand Mannstein. She adopted the stage name Elisabeth Mannstein. From 1877 She was married to the writer Adolph Kohut.

In her career as a singer she appeared at the court opera of St. Petersburg, at the Stadttheater Düsseldorf and at the Krolloper in Berlin. Her performances as Donna Anna in Don Giovanni, as Leonore in Fidelio, in the title role in Euryanthe by Weber and as Frau Fluth in The Merry Wives of Windsor by Otto Nicolai were famous. In 1872 she was engaged at the Theater Aachen. After finishing her active stage career she worked as a singing teacher in Berlin.

She had one son, Oswald Kohut (1877–1951). The politician  was one of her grandchildren.

Work 
 Die große altitalienische Gesangsschule. Introduction by Ludwig Richard Bernscht. Energetos-Ritte-Verlag, Berlin 1922. Table of contents

Theatre seat 
 Premiere: Wiesbaden, 23 March 1870. Mozart: Don Giovanni. Große Oper in 2 Akten. Nach dem Italienischen frei bearbeitet. Interprets: Hermann Philippi: Don Juan. David Klein: Gouverneur Don Petro. Elisabeth Mannstein: Donna Anna. Elisabeth Řebíček-Löffler: Donna Elvira. Bodo Borchers: Don Octavio. F. Lipp: Don Juan's servant Leporello. Franz Fischer: a farm boy Masetto. Ella Guilleaume: his bride Zerline. Printer: Rudolph Bechthold. "Miss Mannstein from the German Theatre in Amsterdam as guest"
 Premiere: Wiesbaden, 30 March 1870. Donizetti: Lucrezia Borgia. Große Oper in 3 Akten. Interprets: Hermann Philippi: Duke of Ferrara Don Alfonso. Elisabeth Mannstein: his wife Lucrezia Borgia. Bodo Borchers: young nobleman in the retinue of the Venetian envoy in Ferrara Gennaro. Hermine Otto: young nobleman in the retinue of the Venetian envoy in Ferrara Orsino. Carl Stengel: young nobleman in the retinue of the Venetian envoy in Ferrara Liveretto. Otto Dornewaß: young nobleman in the retinue of the Venetian envoy in Ferrara Gazella. Franz Fischer: young nobleman in the retinue of the Venetian envoy in Ferrara Petrucci. R. Kuhl: young nobleman in the retinue of the Venetian envoy in Ferrara Bitelozzo. David Klein: Confidant of Duchess Gubetta. Josef Peter Peretti: Officer of Duke Rustighello. Printer: Rudolph Bechthold. "Miss Mannstein from the Deutsches Theater in Amsterdam as guest".

Further reading 
 Die Musik. Monatsschrift. 19. Jg., Deutsche Verlagsanstalt. Stuttgart, Berlin, Leipzig January 1927, . 
 Kohut-Mannstein, Elisabeth. In Deutsche Biographische Enzyklopädie. Volume 6, Saur, Munich 1997, .
 Volker Klimpel: Berühmte Dresdner. Historisch-biographisches Handbuch bedeutender Persönlichkeiten, geboren in Dresden. Hellerau-Verlag, Dresden 2002, .
  Karl-Josef Kutsch, Leo Riemens: Großes Sängerlexikon. Volume 4., extended and updated edition, Saur, Munich 2003, . Numerised

References

External links 
 
 Kohut-Manstein Elisabeth on OPERISSIMO

 	

German operatic sopranos
19th-century German women opera singers
Voice teachers
1843 births
1926 deaths
Musicians from Dresden